The Neftchi Baku 2015–16 season is Neftchi Baku's 24th Azerbaijan Premier League season.

Squad

Out on loan

Transfers

Summer

In:

Out:

Winter

In:

Out:

Friendlies

Competitions

Azerbaijan Premier League

Results summary

Results

League table

Azerbaijan Cup

Final

UEFA Europa League

Qualifying rounds

Squad statistics

Appearances and goals

|-
|colspan="14"|Players away from Neftchi Baku on loan:

|-
|colspan="14"|Players who appeared for Neftchi Baku no longer at the club:

|}

Goal scorers

Disciplinary record

Notes

Qarabağ have played their home games at the Tofiq Bahramov Stadium since 1993 due to the ongoing situation in Quzanlı.

References

Neftchi Baku
Neftçi PFK seasons
Azerbaijani football clubs 2015–16 season